Tenzin Mariko (born 1997) is a Tibetan model and LGBTQ icon. She is the first openly transgender Tibetan in the public eye.

Early life 
Born as Tenzin Ugen to Tsering Gonpo and Chime Yangzom, she was sent to the Samdrup Darjay Choling Monastery in Darjeeling to become a Buddhist monk. At the age of 13, Mariko was sent to Tergar Institute in Kathmandu to further her monastic studies. She left the institute and returned to Dharamshala at the age of 16. Tenzin also went to school in Delhi to become a professional makeup artist, When she came out people took her in a different direction rather than being a makeup artist, They saw her more as a dancer or entertainer. Born in Bir, Himachal Pradesh, she currently lives in the suburb of McLeod Ganj in Dharamshala.

Family 
In the early 1950’s, Marikos parents had fled there families homeland, this is due to it being annexed by the Peoples Republic of China. They had moved to Dharamsala, In the Himalayas. Marikos parents started a new family here and went to have 5 children. They were all boys and were expected to be monks.

Career 
Mariko's first appearance as a transgender model was at the 2015 Miss Tibet pageant held in Dharamshala. In 2018, she participated in MTV India's Ace of Space 1. Tenzin Marko gave a TedTalk on TEDxDharmshala on August 29th, 2019. Titled “The Monk Who Traded His Robes for Skirts”, Marko narrates her story of accepting her sexuality and coming out as the first Tibetan transgender woman.

References 

Transgender in Asia
Tibetan people
Transgender female models
Transgender actresses
1997 births
Living people
People from Kangra district